La Gran Vía, is a shopping mall in Antiguo Cuscatlán, El Salvador. The mall is owned by Dueñas, and is developed by the company Urbánica.

It was opened in 2005, and has a pedestrian area and a shopping area 
with national and international stores.

In 2006 the mail incorporated a new section that includes a business center and a hotel, under the franchise Marriott,  and other attractions such as the Mini Golf.

See also 
Siman
Galerias Shopping Mall
Zona Rosa El Salvador

References

External links 
Official website La Gran Vía (Spanish)
Siman
Noticias digital de seguros MAPFRE https://www.mapfre.com.sv/seguros-sv/images/no-38-tercer-trimestre-2011_tcm586-77052.pdf (page 22).
Published December 6, 2005, El Diario de Hoy http://archivo.elsalvador.com/noticias/2005/12/06/negocios/neg3.asp
http://www.elsalvador.com/noticias/2005/12/07/negocios/neg12.asp (Site in spanish)
http://www.elsalvador.com/noticias/2005/12/06/negocios/neg3.asp (Site in spanish)
https://archive.today/20130630060217/http://www.revistasumma.com/negocios/38547-alejandro-duenas-hay-zonas-en-el-salvador-que-todavia-tienen-area-para-planificar-bien-otra-pequena-ciudad.html (Site in spanish)

San Salvador
Shopping malls in El Salvador